The seventeenth season of the American talent show competition series America's Got Talent premiered on NBC on May 31, 2022, and concluded on September 14, 2022. This season featured the return of a full audience without COVID-19 restrictions, which had begun during the fifteenth season.

The season was won by dance group Mayyas, with pole dancer Kristy Sellars finishing second, and singer and guitarist Drake Milligan placing third.

Production 
On March 31, 2022, it was announced that the entire main cast from the previous season would return for the new season and that the season would premiere on May 31. Originally, host Terry Crews announced the 'end of an era' in September 2021, stating that the season sixteen finale of America's Got Talent and the series finale of Brooklyn Nine-Nine had marked the end of his deal with NBC.

Judge Howie Mandel was partially absent from the June 14, July 19, and August 2 episodes, and was entirely absent in the July 12 episode, due to contracting COVID-19 at the 2022 Kids' Choice Awards. Additionally, judge Sofía Vergara was absent from the judge deliberations at Simon Cowell's house.

The live shows for the season were held at the Pasadena Civic Auditorium, the same venue where auditions have been filmed since season eleven. The live shows had been held at the Dolby Theatre since the same season, excluding season fifteen, during which the live shows were held at Universal Studios Hollywood.

Season overview 
Judge Simon Cowell and host Terry Crews featured their favorite Golden Buzzer recipients from the previous seasons in a special retrospective episode on July 5. Singer Nightbirde from season sixteen was ranked as the number one Golden Buzzer in AGT history. Inspired by Nightbirde, who died from cancer in February 2022, Lebanese dance group Mayyas previously honored her during an audition episode on June 21. They received a Golden Buzzer from judge Sofía Vergara.

For the second time in AGT history (the first in season sixteen), a group Golden Buzzer was given by all the judges and host on the July 19 episode, to country trio Chapel Hart for their original song "You Can Have Him Jolene".

Unlike previous seasons of AGT, the live show format was changed to accommodate the top 55 acts, which were divided into five qualifying rounds of eleven acts (two acts from each qualifying round plus a wildcard advanced to the finals), instead of the usual quarter-final and semi-final rounds. In the judge deliberations portion of the episode aired on August 2, the judges selected 54 of the top 55 spots. Following this episode, a public vote was opened to allow viewers to vote the last act into the live shows. Danger act Auzzy Blood, singers Ben Waites and Debbii Dawson, and comedian Jordan Conley were all in contention for the final spot in the top 55. During the August 9 live show, it was announced that Conley had won the America's Wildcard vote.

During the final qualifying round results show on September 7, an Instant Save vote was held for viewers to send a final wildcard into the finals. The four acts included in this vote were acts that were eliminated in the live shows, with each act selected by one of the judges; Mandel selected Don McMillan, Klum selected Lily Meola, Vergara selected Celia Muñoz, and Cowell selected Players Choir. Celia Muñoz ultimately won the public vote, taking the last spot in the season's finals.

 |  |  |  | 
  America's Wildcard |  Final Wildcard |  Golden Buzzer Audition

Qualifiers summary 
 Buzzed Out |  |   |

Qualifier 1 (August 9) 
Guest Performer, Results Show: Dustin Tavella with Sarah Hyland

Qualifier 2 (August 16) 
Guest Performer, Results Show: Jon Dorenbos

Qualifier 3 (August 23) 
Guest Performers, Results Show: Kodi Lee with Teddy Swims and Neal Schon

  Celia Muñoz was later brought back as a Wildcard act for the Finals.

Qualifier 4 (August 30) 
Guest Performers, Results Show: Piff the Magic Dragon and Riverdance

Qualifier 5 (September 6) 
Guest Performer, Results Show: Cast of & Juliet

Finals (September 13–14) 
Guest Performers, Results Show: Black Eyed Peas and Light Balance

 |  |  | 

  Nicolas RIBS and Yu Hojin conducted a joint routine for their second performance, and thus shared the same guest performer.
  Chapel Hart and Drake Milligan conducted a joint routine for their second performance, and thus shared the same guest performers.
  Metaphysic and Mike E. Winfield conducted a joint routine for their second performance, and thus shared the same guest performers.
  Kristy Sellars and Mayyas conducted a joint routine for their second performance.

Ratings

Notes

References 

2022 American television seasons
America's Got Talent seasons